Ibrahim Khalil Khan palace or Ibrahim Khalil Khan castle is a historical palace located in the south-eastern part of Shusha, near Dashalty village. In some sources, the palace is also called palace of Karabakh Khans.

An architectural monument of national importance registered in Azerbaijan.

History 
It was built in 1751-1753 by the order of Panah Ali Khan. The palace was damaged after the Armenian occupation of Shusha in May 1992. On November 8, 2020, the city was liberated.

About
Ibrahim Khalil Khan palace was a square building and was surrounded on four sides by castle walls. Semicircular towers open from inside are located at four corners of castle walls. Servants who served the people living in the palace lived in the residential buildings connected to the towers, inside the palace.

The main entrance to the north of the castle is protected by a prismatic volume. From this point of view, the entrance of the castle repeats the technique applied at Ganja Gate of Shusha fortress. This type of construction technique strengthens the protection of the door and reduces the possibility of direct access to it to zero.

All the buildings included in the palace complex are covered with arches and ceilings made of small well-hewn stones.

Entrance door construction: door stone made of solid stone (2.40 x 0.70 x 0.45 m) stands on a door frame made of solid stone and 2.10 meters high. There is a relief arch made of well-hewn stones on the door frame. The tympanum of the arch is made of large rough stones with idol masonry. This kind of entrance doors is widespread in the architecture of Shusha.

See also
Ibrahim Khalil Khan
Panah Ali Khan
Shusha State Historical and Architectural Reserve
Karabakh Khanate

References

Source
 
 
 
 
 

Architecture in Azerbaijan
Palaces in Azerbaijan
Royal residences in Azerbaijan
Karabakh Khanate
18th century in Azerbaijan
18th-century establishments in Iran